The Foreign Air Supply Company (C.E.R.A.) was an air supply unit of the French Foreign Legion. It provided air delivery of supplies during the First Indochina War.

From October 1948, the Compagnie de Ravitaillement Par Air des Troupes Françaises d’Indochine Nord was assigned to the 1er RCP; then was renamed CRA de la Base Aéroportée Nord (CRA/BAPN) on January 1, 1949. 

The company was created on January 1, 1951 from the Air Supply Company (CRA/BAPN). Stationed at Hanoi until 1 August, the foreign combat company was in charge of delivering logistical supply and was manned by 120 legionnaires and 70 autochthones.

Dissolved, the foreign combat company became on September 1, 1951, the Air Supply Company of the Land Forces of North Vietam  (CRA/FTNV). It then became CRA 3 in 1953.

References

External links 
 CERA - History of the CERA

Ordnance (stores) units and formations
Military units and formations of the First Indochina War
1951 establishments in French Indochina
Military units and formations established in 1951
Military units and formations disestablished in 1951